Living Thing is the fifth album by Peter Bjorn and John, released on 30 March 2009 in the UK and 31 March in the US. Much darker and more experimental than their previous album Writer's Block, Living Thing expands the sound of the group by taking more cues from hip-hop and electronic music, in particular the work of African electronic funk musician William Onyeabor. Three singles were eventually released from the album: "Nothing To Worry About," 'It Don't Move Me," and "Lay It Down."

Reception

Initial critical response to Living Thing was generally positive. At Metacritic, the album has received a score of 68 based on 31 reviews. However, some were unsatisfied with the apparent darker tone of the album as a follow-up to their previous success with Young Folks.

Track listing
 "The Feeling" – 3:08
 "It Don't Move Me" – 3:21
 "Just the Past" – 5:10
 "Nothing to Worry About" – 2:56
 "I'm Losing My Mind" – 3:44
 "Living Thing" – 4:38
 "I Want You!"  – 3:39
 "Lay It Down" – 3:26
 "Stay This Way" – 4:19
 "Blue Period Picasso" – 4:36
 "4 Out of 5" – 4:08
 "Last Night" – 4:03

References

2009 albums
Peter Bjorn and John albums
Startime International albums
Wichita Recordings albums
Albums produced by Björn Yttling